Catching a Killer is a British true crime documentary television series that has aired on Channel 4 since 2017. Each episode documents detectives with the Thames Valley Police as they investigate a murder. Five episodes have aired as of January 2020.  The series is produced by True Vision productions.

Episodes

References

External links 
 
 Catching a Killer at Channel 4

Channel 4 documentary series
2017 British television series debuts
2010s British documentary television series
English-language television shows
Documentary television series about policing